The Labour Bureaux (London) Act 1902 (2 Edw. VII c. 13) was an Act of Parliament of the Parliament of the United Kingdom, given the royal assent on 22 July 1902 and repealed in 1973.

It authorised the establishment of labour bureaux by borough councils throughout London, to be funded out of the general rates.

The Act was repealed by the Statute Law (Repeals) Act 1973.

References
The Public General Acts Passed in the Second Year of the Reign of His Majesty King Edward the Seventh. London: printed for His Majesty's Stationery Office. 1902.
Chronological table of the statutes; HMSO, London. 1993.

United Kingdom Acts of Parliament 1902
1902 in London
Repealed United Kingdom Acts of Parliament
Acts of the Parliament of the United Kingdom concerning London